RunGEM is a freeware component of the commercial modelling package, Gempack.

It is mainly used for solving (i.e., simulating with) computable general equilibrium (CGE) models. It does not allow a user to change a model's specification or to create a new model.

External links
 RunGEM Homepage

Computer algebra systems